Takatoshi Iwatsuki (born 29 November 1964) is a Japanese rower. He competed in the men's eight event at the 1992 Summer Olympics.

References

1964 births
Living people
Japanese male rowers
Olympic rowers of Japan
Rowers at the 1992 Summer Olympics
Place of birth missing (living people)
Asian Games medalists in rowing
Rowers at the 1994 Asian Games
Asian Games silver medalists for Japan
Medalists at the 1994 Asian Games